4, 3, 2, 1 or 4321 may refer to:

Film
 4.3.2.1., 2010 film by Noel Clarke
 ...4 ..3 ..2 ..1 ...Morte, a 1967 Italian science fiction film

Music
 "4, 3, 2, 1" (k-os song), song by k-os
 "4, 3, 2, 1" (LL Cool J song), song by LL Cool J
 "4-3-2-1", song by Raffi Boghosyan

Other uses
 4 3 2 1 (novel), 2017 novel by Paul Auster
 4–3–2–1, a common formation in association football

See also
1234 (disambiguation)
"5-4-3-2-1", a 1963 single by Manfred Mann
 54321, a 2016 Tamil thriller film
Countdown, a sequence of backward counting to indicate the time remaining before an event is scheduled to occur